United Nations Security Council resolution 547, adopted unanimously on 13 January 1984, after reaffirming previous resolutions on the topic, the Council expressed its concern at the death sentences issued to Malesela Benjamin Maloise, a member of the African National Congress.

The resolution called upon the South African authorities to commute the sentences imposed on Mr Maloise, and urged all other Member States and organisations to help save the life of the man. The resolution passed fourteen votes in favour, none against, France abstained.

Maloise, a black poet, was convicted of murdering a policeman. Despite a court ruling that Maloise was under heavy psychological pressure at the time, President Pieter Willem Botha ordered his execution. On 18 October 1985, Maloise was hanged in Pretoria Central Prison.

See also
 List of United Nations Security Council Resolutions 501 to 600 (1982–1987)
 Resolutions 503, 525 and 533
 South Africa under apartheid

References

External links
 
Text of the Resolution at undocs.org

 0547
 0547
January 1984 events
1984 in South Africa